TransWorld University (TWU) is a private university in Douliu City, Yunlin County, Taiwan.

TWU offers undergraduate, graduate, and doctoral programs in a variety of fields, including business, design, humanities, and technology. The university also offers international programs in which students can study abroad in countries such as the United States, Canada, Australia, and Japan.

History
TWU was founded in 1992 as Transworld Junior College of Commerce. In 2000, it was upgraded to Transworld Institute of Technology. Finally on 1 August 2010, the institute was approved to be the TransWorld University. On 17 March 2015, TWU signed a Memorandum of Understanding (MOU) with VTAR Institute (VTAR), Malaysia to allow VTAR graduates from Beauty Therapy or Hairdressing further studies. In 2020, the university had an enrollment rate of less than 60%.

Faculties
 College of Design
 College of Health Science
 College of Management
 College of Hospitality and Tourism

Campus
The university campus building is constructed on land that belongs to the Taiwan Sugar Corporation.

Presidents
 Chen Xin-zhang (1992–1994)
 Zeng Ruo-ying (1994–1995)
 Lai Shin-sheng (1995–1996)
 Hsu Shu-hsiang (1996–2002)
 Peng Tso-kwei (2002–2004)
 Lin Ming-fung (2004–2006)
 Hsu Shu-hsiang (2006–2016)
 Chen I-hsing (2016)

Transportation
The university is accessible within walking distance South of Douliu Station of Taiwan Railways.

See also
 List of universities in Taiwan

References

External links

 

1992 establishments in Taiwan
Educational institutions established in 1992
Universities and colleges in Yunlin County
Universities and colleges in Taiwan
Technical universities and colleges in Taiwan